Jefferson Township is a former civil township in Cook County, Illinois, United States that existed as a separate municipality from 1850 until 1889 when it was annexed into the city of Chicago. Its borders were Devon Avenue on the north, Harlem Avenue on the west, Western Avenue to the east, and North Avenue to the south. This region comprised most of what is now known as the Chicago's Northwest Side including the entirety of the following community areas: Jefferson Park, North Park, Albany Park, Irving Park, Avondale, Hermosa, Belmont-Cragin, Montclare, Portage Park, as well as parts of Forest Glen, West Ridge, Lincoln Square, North Center, Logan Square, West Town, Humboldt Park, Austin, Dunning, the suburb of Norridge, the suburb of Harwood Heights, and Norwood Park.

During its brief history it developed from unpopulated wildlife to a largely rural community with a number of suburban villages.  However, due to infrastructure limitations, legislative incentives and the lure of better municipal services it, along with numerous adjoining townships, agreed to be annexed into the city of Chicago, creating the largest city in the United States at that time.

History
The township was founded in 1850. In the 1850s, Chicago was still a walkable urban area well contained within a  radius of the center.

After the City of Chicago incorporated in 1837, the surrounding townships followed suit through 1870.  After 1850, Cook County was divided into basic governmental entities, which were designated as townships as a result of the new Illinois Constitution.  Illinois's permissive incorporation law empowered any community of 300 resident citizens to petition the Illinois legislature for incorporation as a municipality under a municipal charter with more extensive powers to provide services and tax local residents.  Jefferson Township was created by the Illinois General Assembly in 1861 within Cook County.  This empowered the township to better govern the provision of services to its increasingly suburban residents.

Following the June 29, 1889 elections, several suburban townships voted to be annexed to the city, which offered better services, such as improved water supply, sewerage, and fire and police protection.  After the 1889 annexation Chicago was able to leverage efficiencies as the largest United States city in area and second largest in population.

The township has no current governmental structure or functions, other than being used by the Cook County Assessor's office for taxation valuation and record keeping purposes.

Notes

References
Keating, Ann Durkin. Building Chicago: Suburban Developers and the Creation of a Divided Metropolis. 1988.
Miller, Donald L. City of the Century: The Epic of Chicago and the Making of America pp. 282–284; 292.

Townships in Cook County, Illinois
History of Chicago
Populated places established in 1861
Former municipalities in Illinois
Former townships in Illinois
Former populated places in Illinois
1861 establishments in Illinois